Dyspyralis is a moth genus in the family Erebidae. The genus was erected by Warren in 1891.

Species
 Dyspyralis humerata Smith, 1908
 Dyspyralis illocata Warren, 1891 – visitation moth
 Dyspyralis immuna Smith, 1908
 Dyspyralis nigellus Strecker, 1900 (sometimes spelled as Dyspyralis nigella)
 Dyspyralis noloides Barnes & McDunnough, 1916
 Dyspyralis puncticosta J. B. Smith, 1908 – spot-edged dyspyralis moth
 Dyspyralis serratula Bethune-Baker, 1908

References

Hypenodinae
Moth genera